Glenreagh is a small town in the Clarence Valley in the Northern Rivers region of north-eastern New South Wales, Australia.  At the 2016 census, Glenreagh had a population of 900 people.

It is on the North Coast railway line, completed to Glenreagh in 1915.  A picturesque branch was opened from Glenreagh to Dorrigo in 1924, but was difficult to maintain due to the steep terrain and high rainfall and it was closed in 1972 after a washaway.  The Glenreagh to Ulong section is proposed for reopening as a heritage tourist railway by the Glenreagh Mountain Railway.

Facilities and Services
 The Village Market Place (operates first Saturday each month)
 Glenreagh General Store
 The Golden Dog Hotel
 Boo Radley's Hall (lovingly reconstructed hardwood performance hall, dedicated to hosting all forms of live music, painting, and ceramics)

Annual Events
 Glenreagh Timber Festival is held on the last Saturday in July of each year.

School
Glenreagh Public School was established in 1887. It is a small school with fewer than 100 pupils (as at 2023).

Notes

Towns in New South Wales
Northern Rivers
North Coast railway line, New South Wales
Clarence Valley Council